Borbo ratek is a butterfly in the family Hesperiidae. It is found in the forested regions of  northern and eastern Madagascar.

References

Butterflies described in 1833
Hesperiinae